Sixth grade (or grade six in some regions) is the sixth year of schooling. Students are typically 11–12 years old, depending on when their birthday occurs. Different terms and numbers are used in  parts of the world. It is commonly the first or second grade of middle school, and the sixth school year since kindergarten.

Afghanistan 
In Afghanistan, Grade 6 is the first year of middle school. Students are aged 11–12.

France
In France, the equivalent of sixth grade is Sixième and is the first year of Collège (middle school). Students are 11-12 years old

Germany 
In Germany, where the different federal states have different educational systems, Grade 6 (6. Klasse) is either the final year of primary school or the second year of secondary school.

Israel 
In Israel, Grade 6 (called Kita Vav) is the final year of elementary school.

Kuwait 
In Kuwait, Grade 6 can be the first year of middle school but it can also be the final year of elementary school (depending on the education system in place).

Laos 
In Laos, Grade 6 is the first year of middle school.

Malaysia 
In Malaysia, the equivalent is Year 6 also known as Standard 6, as the Malaysia academic year starts in January. Students will sit for an important exam called Ujian Penilaian Sekolah Rendah (UPSR), which translates from Malay into English as "Low/Elementary School Assessment Test", before graduating from elementary education. Standard 6 is the final primary/elementary school year before embarking into secondary /high school (Form 1). In Malaysia, primary education are commonly broken down into primary school and secondary school.

Mexico 
“Primaria” education, in its current form became compulsory in 2009, and runs from grade one through grade six, for students aged 6 – 12 years. The Secretariat of Public Education (SEP) officially determines primary school a part of ‘Basic Education’, making it free of charge, with one year of mandatory pre-school education. SEP standardizes curriculum content for public and private schools, which includes Spanish, mathematics, natural sciences, history, geography, art, and physical education. The National Institute for Assessment of Education monitors standards and provides quality control.
Middle Education

Peru 
In Peru, grade 6 is the final year of primary school.

Philippines 
In the Philippines, Grade 6 is the final year of Intermediate Level and Elementary School curriculum.

The educational system that has been in use since 1945 was entirely phased out upon the implementation of K-12 curriculum on Grade 6 in June 5, 2017.

Portugal
In Portugal, grade 6 (6º ano de escolaridade) is the second year of middle school.

Poland
In Poland, grade 6 (klasa szósta) is the sixth year of primary/elementary school. Until 2017, it was the last year of primary/elementary school, and at the end of it, students took the sprawdzian szóstoklasisty, which translates into "sixth grader's exam"

Brazil
In Brazil, grade 6 (6º Ano or 6ª Série) is the first year of middle school. It is the sexto ano do Ensino Fundamental II.

Saudi Arabia 
In Saudi Arabia, Grade 6 is the last year of elementary school.

Singapore 
In Singapore, the equivalent is Year 6 also known as Primary 6. They would have to take the Primary School Leaving Examination at around September to proceed to Secondary School.

During this time, students in Primary 6 would learn Algebra and 3D Shapes, age from 12–13 years old.

South Korea 
In South Korea, Grade 6 is the final year of elementary school.

Sweden 
In Sweden, Grade 6 is the final year of middle school (mellanstadiet). Students are often 12-13 years old unless they've been promoted or held back. The following grade (Grade 7) is then the start of high school (högstadiet). Students get grades for the first time in Grade 6; once at the end of the first term/winter term (Terminsbetyg) and one at the end of the grade (Sexans betyg).

Students also get to do their second national tests, called "Nationella prov" in Sweden. These tests are done at the end of Grade 3, Grade 6 and finally Grade 9. In Grade 6, the students participate in two different parts of the tests: First oral tests during the first term and then written tests in the second. The oral test is test A, then the written tests are done on separate days and are divided into Test B, C, D and E.

These tests are done in the subjects Swedish/Swedish as secondary language, Math and English. In Grade 3 students only do one oral test in Swedish and written tests in Swedish and Math and in Grade 9 students do oral tests in the subjects Swedish, Math and English and written tests in Swedish, Math, English, Social Studies (SO) and Science (NO). Some schools also do written tests in modern languages (German, French, Spanish).

Vietnam 
In Vietnam, Grade 6 is the first year of middle school.

United States 
The sixth grade is the sixth school year after Kindergarten. Students are usually either 11 or 12 years old,

Uruguay 
In Uruguay, the sixth grade is the sixth and final year of primary school. Students are usually 11 1/2 years old.

See also
Year Six
Educational stage
Student

References

6
Primary education
Secondary education